Lee High School is a public high school located in Lee County, Virginia, United States, near the town of Jonesville. It is a part of the Lee County School District and is one of two high schools in the county.

History
Founded in 1989, Lee High School was formed by consolidating Jonesville High School, Dryden High School, Keokee High School, Flatwoods High School, and Pennington High School.

Athletics
The football team made the state playoffs in 2013, 2014, and 2015.

Lee High dropped from Group AA to Group A status in the 2007-2008 year (granted due to "travel hardship"). Lee's former district, the AA Highlands District, was dissolved with two members moving to the AA Southwest District and another school moving down with Lee and joining a new district. This new district, which is a part of A Region D, is the A Clinch Mountain District.

The 1990 Golf team is the only team to win a state championship for the school to date, in VHSL Group AA. The boys tennis team was Group A state runner-up in 2011.

In 2008, Lee High's Scholastic Bowl team (part of the VHSL) finished 3rd at the Group A VHSL State Tournament.

Vocational classes
Lee High School offers students elective vocational classes located in the Lee County Career and Technical Center building. Classes include: Agriculture, Auto Body Repair, Building Maintenance, Building Trade, Business Ed., Childcare, Cosmetology, Criminology, Culinary Arts, Drafting, Electricity, Family Consumer Science, Farm Machine Repair, Horticulture, Small Animal Care, Marketing, Networking, Nursing, Small Engine Repair, Technology Ed., and Welding.

Also offered at Lee High School is Navy JROTC.

References

External links

Educational institutions established in 1989
Public high schools in Virginia
Schools in Lee County, Virginia
1989 establishments in Virginia